Hilly Gene Hicks Sr.  is an American character actor.

Early life
Hicks was born in Los Angeles, California.

Biography
The role for which Hicks is perhaps best known is Lewis Harvey (the younger son of Alex Haley's second great-grandfather Chicken George) in the TV mini-series Roots. He appeared in the programs Adam-12, The Rookies, The Bill Cosby Show, Night Gallery, Hill Street Blues, M*A*S*H (appearing twice; once as a soldier trying to steal penicillin and again as an Army medic), Roll Out! (a short-lived sitcom created by M*A*S*H producers Larry Gelbart & Gene Reynolds), the TV movie Friendly Fire, the theatrical movies Gray Lady Down and Raise the Titanic. Hicks appeared in the Barnaby Jones episode titled "Dangerous Summer" (02/11/1975). He starred as Robbie Robertson in the 1977 television movie pilot for the CBS series The Amazing Spider-Man, and did voicework in Hanna Barbera's 1970s Godzilla TV cartoon. He also played Brent in the period film and mini-series Louisiana.

Hicks has been pastor of New Beginnings United Methodist Church North Campus (July 2013 to June 2015) in San Bernardino, California; Emmanuel United Methodist Church (July 2010 to June 2015) in San Bernardino, California; and Crenshaw United Methodist Church (July 2008 to June 2010) in Inglewood, California. 

Hicks is the father of playwright Hilly Hicks, Jr.

References

External links
 Crenshaw United Methodist Church
 Clip of Hilly Hicks Auditioning for Chicago's PM Magazine
 

Living people
African-American male actors
African-American Methodists
American male television actors
American male film actors
Male actors from Los Angeles
American United Methodist clergy
21st-century African-American people
20th-century African-American people
Year of birth missing (living people)